Starogard Gdański (until 1950: Starogard; ; formerly ) is a city in Pomeranian Voivodeship in northern Poland with 48,328 inhabitants (2004).

Starogard is the capital of Starogard County. It is also the second biggest city (after Tczew) of the ethnocultural region Kociewie and is populated by Kociewians.

Geographical location 

Etymology 

The name Starogard means "old city" in the Pomeranian language. Gdański is appended in the 20th century to the name to differentiate it from other places named Starogard. The German name Preußisch Stargard (Prussian Stargard) was similarly used to disambiguate from other places named Stargard. (See Stargard (disambiguation)).

History 

Archeological evidence indicates remnants of a neolithic settlement from four to five thousand years ago.

The area became part of the emerging Polish state under its first ruler Mieszko I of Poland in the 10th century, and during the fragmentation period in Poland it was part of a Pomeranian duchy, which separated from Poland in 1227. Starogrod (as Starigrod) was first mentioned in 1198 when Duke Grzymisław II of Pomerania granted the settlement to the Knights Hospitaller. The Slavic name Stargarde was mentioned in 1269. In 1282, Mestwin II and Polish Duke Przemysł II signed the Treaty of Kępno, which transferred the suzerainty over Gdańsk Pomerania including Starogard to Przemysł II and reunited the region with Poland. Together with the rest of Gdańsk Pomerania it came under the rule of the Teutonic Knights during the 1308 Teutonic takeover of Danzig (Gdańsk). In 1348 the town received city rights under Kulm Law by Grandmaster Heinrich Dusemer.

Since 31 March 1440 Starogard was a member of the Prussian Confederation. It took an active part in the 1454 uprising against the Teutonic Order that led to the Thirteen Years' War (1454–66). In 1454, Polish King Casimir IV Jagiellon re-incorporated the region to the Kingdom of Poland upon the request of the Confederation, and the city recognized the King as the rightful ruler. In 1461 the Teutonic Knights took over Starogard, which was then eventually recaptured by Poland in July 1466. In the peace treaty signed in Toruń a few months later in 1466, the Teutonic Knights renounced any claims to the city, and recognized it as part of Poland. It became part of the Pomeranian Voivodeship in the province of Royal Prussia in the larger Greater Poland Province. It remained under Polish rule until the First Partition of Poland in 1772, when it became part of the Kingdom of Prussia under the name Preußisch Stargard. The city was subjected to Germanisation policies. One of the main escape routes for insurgents of the unsuccessful Polish November Uprising from partitioned Poland to the Great Emigration led through the city.

In 1871, a large vodka distillery was built on the western end of city, which survived both world wars and today produces Sobieski and Krupnik. It is one of Europe's oldest continuously-run vodka distilleries, and one of only a very small handful of vodka distilleries predating 1945. In 1871, with the Prussian-led unification of Germany, Preußisch Stargard became part of the German Empire. In the same year, it was connected to the rail network and in 1900 a water and gas network was built in the city. At the beginning of the 20th century, the city had a Protestant church, a Catholic church, a synagogue, a grammar school, a preparatory institute, a district court, a Reichsbank branch, a main tax office and a number of commercial operations. According to the census of 1905, the town had a population of 10,485, of which 6,297 (60.1%) were Germans. In 1906–1907, local Polish children joined the children school strikes against Germanisation that spread throughout the Prussian Partition of Poland.

Until 1920, the city belonged to the Preußisch Stargard district in Regierungsbezirk Danzig in the Province of West Prussia in Germany. After World War I, it was reincorporated into Poland, which had just regained independence as the Second Polish Republic. In the interbellum it was a county seat administratively located in the Pomeranian Voivodeship of Poland.

World War II

During the joint German-Soviet invasion of Poland, which started World War II in September 1939, the city was invaded by Nazi Germany, and then the German Einsatzkommando 16 and SS Wachsturmbann "Eimann" entered the city to commit various crimes against Poles. Under German occupation, the city was annexed into the newly formed Regierungsbezirk Danzig in the new province of Reichsgau Danzig-West Prussia. The Polish population was subjected to mass arrests, imprisonment, tortures, massacres, expulsions, deportations to concentration camps and to forced labour.

The Germans immediately carried out mass arrests of Polish teachers, priests and local activists in the town and county as part of the Intelligenzaktion. Arrested Poles were then held both in the pre-war prison and the medieval Gdańsk Tower and often subjected to brutal beatings and mistreatment, especially clergymen, some of whom had even swastikas cut into their foreheads. Already in September 1939, the Germans murdered 150 Poles, including inhabitants of Starogard, Skórcz and Gdynia, in the city and its vicinity.

Beginning in September 1939 in nearby Szpęgawski Forest (north-east of the city) Germans killed in mass executions about 7,000 Poles, among them 1,680 Kocborowo (district of Starogard) and Świecie psychiatric hospitals patients. About 500 handicapped children were killed in the hospital, in Action T4. 2,842 patients died between 1940-1944. Polish hospital staff was either murdered in the Szpęgawski Forest or deported to concentration camps or to forced labour to Germany. A local parish priest was murdered in a massacre of around 230 Poles in Płutowo. The Germans also established and operated a subcamp of the Stutthof concentration camp in the town.

Despite such circumstances, Poles still organized an underground resistance movement, including the Home Army and Jaszczurka organizations.

In 1945 the German occupation ended and the town was restored to Poland, however with a Soviet-installed communist regime, which remained in power until the Fall of Communism in the 1980s.

Contemporary history
The Jord-Just youth anti-communist resistance organization was established in Starogard in 1951 by 16-year old girl Teresa Block. The organization was eventually crushed by the communists, who sentenced 17 teenage members to 1.5 to 9 years in prison.

Number of inhabitants by year 

Note that the above table is based on primary, possibly biased, sources.

Major corporations 

 Polpharma SA
 Destylarnia Sobieski SA

Transport

The Polish National road 22 and Voivodeship road 222 pass through the city, and the A1 motorway runs nearby, east of the city. There is a train station in Starogard.

Education 

 Pomorska Szkoła Wyższa w Starogardzie Gdańskim
 I Liceum Ogólnokształcące w Starogardzie Gdańskim

Sports 
The town's most notable sports club is basketball team SKS Starogard Gdański, which plays in the Polish Basketball League (Poland's top division), Polish Cup winners in 2011, and runners-up in 2006. The local football club is KP Starogard Gdański, and it competes in the III liga (Polish fourth tier). The team plays in green and white at the Stadion Miejski.

The town was home to the Polish World Cup football player and Olympic Gold Medal winner Kazimierz Deyna. Deyna grew up in Starogard Gdański, and the local Stadion Miejski im. Kazimierza Deyny is named after him. There is also a statue to him in the seating area of the ground, and a heritage trail through the town which takes in his birthplace, family home and murals to the sportsman. Starogard Gdański also boasted Olympic bronze medal winner Oktawia Nowacka. Michael Hicks, an Olympian that represents Poland in 3x3 Basketball at the 2020 Olympic Games, currently resides in Starogard Gdański and holds basketball camps for the youth.

Notable people 

 Adolf Lesser (1851–1926) a German physician who specialized in forensic medicine
 Michael F. Blenski (1862–1932), Wisconsin politician
 Adolf Wallenberg (1862–1949) a German internist and neurologist
 John S. Flizikowski, (1868–1934) a Chicago architect
 Ferdinand Noeldechen (1895–1951), general
 Theo Mackeben (1897–1953) a German pianist, conductor and composer, particularly of film music
 Kazimierz Kropidłowski (1931–1998) a Polish long jumper, competed at the 1956 Summer Olympics
 Henryk Jankowski (1936-2010) a Polish Roman Catholic priest and Member of Solidarity movement
 Kazimierz Deyna (1947–1989), soccer player, over 600 pro games and 97 for Poland
 Władysław Wojtakajtis (1949–2016) a Polish swimmer, competed at the 1968 and 1972 Summer Olympics
 Andrzej Grubba (1958–2005) a Polish table tennis player
 Maria Kamrowska (born 1966) a retired Polish heptathlete. 
 Paweł Papke (born 1977) a former Polish volleyball player
 Piotr Wiśniewski (born 1982) a Polish footballer, who played 230 games for Lechia Gdańsk
 Oktawia Nowacka (born 1991) a Polish modern pentathlete and bronze medalist in the 2016 Summer Olympics

Partnership towns

Notes

References

History of Pomerania
Cities and towns in Pomeranian Voivodeship
Starogard County
Pomeranian Voivodeship (1919–1939)
Nazi war crimes in Poland